The Wenamba are an Aboriginal Australian people of the central eastern edge of Western Australia in the Goldfields Region.

Language
The Wenamba spoke a dialect similar to that of the Pintupi.

Country
The Wenamba ranged over an estimated . Norman Tindale places them to the north of the Rawlinson Ranges and Lake Neale and Lake Hopkins, extending northwards to the area of Lake Macdonald. Their western limits are set at a place called Kurultu/Kurultja, believed to be somewhere around the Baron Range.

People
The Wenamba, though tribally distinct, were closely affiliated to the Pintupi. The Wenamba were one of several desert tribes known generically as Kalgonei/Kalgoneidjara, One telling term used of them, Mangawara, meant 'chignon bearers' referring to their dressing their hair in buns, which in turn served to hold some of their possessions.

History
The police ranger Walter MacDougall was the first white man known to have contact with the Wenamba. While camping one night near the Rawlinson Ranges, his attention was drawn to a shuffling noise, and he looked up and noticed a little native girl quietly walking towards the campfire. At that point, the Wenamba father drew near, his hands splayed to show he carried no weapons. The 'drifters' spoke a dialect distinct from Ngadadjara and Pitjantjatjara, though they could understand the latter. With an amicable rapport established, the father then fetched his three-barbed spear, unlike the single barb deployed by the other two tribes.

In 1950, some Wenamba were reported to have moved over to the Northern Territory to settle at the Yuendumu Government Station, and, after a further stay at Haasts Bluff to have upped stakes and moved back to their traditional lands, preferring to return to their nomadic ways.

Alternative names
 Wenanba
 Wankawinan (Pitjantjatjara exonym)
 Kalgonei (a Ngadadjara term for the dialect they spoke)
 Wanudjara Ngadadjara
 Pintularapi (a vulgar term applied indiscriminately to both the Pintupi and Wenamba by the Ngadadjara)
 Mangawara
 Kalguni?
 Widanda
 Tjurti (Pintupi exonym).

Notes

Citations

Sources

Aboriginal peoples of Western Australia
Canning Stock Route
Mid West (Western Australia)